Jacques Pras (12 June 1924 – 18 July 1982) was a French professional road bicycle racer. His most important victory was the 4th stage of the 1948 Tour de France.

Major results

1948
Tour de France:
Winner stage 4
1950
Brive
1958
Allasac

References

External links 

Official Tour de France results for Jacques Pras

1924 births
1982 deaths
Sportspeople from Charente
French male cyclists
French Tour de France stage winners
Cyclists from Nouvelle-Aquitaine